BirdLife South Africa, formerly the South African Ornithological Society (SAOS), is the South African national partner organisation of BirdLife International.

It has a membership of 5,000, many of whom belong to more than 32 affiliated bird clubs.  BirdLife South Africa's vision is to promote the enjoyment, understanding, study and conservation of wild birds and their habitats.  It publishes an ornithological journal, Ostrich, covering the birds of Africa and its islands, as well as the magazine African BirdLife.

One of the major projects with which it is involved is the Second Southern African Bird Atlas Project (SABAP2). It is one of three partners which lead this project: the other two are the Animal Demography Unit at the University of Cape Town and the South African National Biodiversity Institute (SANBI).

BirdLife South Africa has three Honorary patrons, Gaynor Rupert, Precious Moloi-Motsepe and Mark Shuttleworth.

List of affiliated bird clubs 

 Barberton Bird Club
 BirdLife Border
 BirdLife Eastern Cape
 BirdLife Harties
 BirdLife Inkwazi
 BirdLife KZN Midlands
 BirdLife Lowveld
 BirdLife Northern Gauteng
 BirdLife Northern Natal
 BirdLife Overberg
 BirdLife Plettenberg Bay
 BirdLife Polokwane
 BirdLife Port Natal
 BirdLife President Ridge
 BirdLife Rustenburg
 BirdLife Sandton
 BirdLife Sisonke
 BirdLife Soutpansberg
 BirdLife Trogons
 BirdLife Wesvaal
 BirdLife Worcester
 BirdLife Zululand
 Cape Bird Club
 Cuckoo Bird Club
 Hermanus Bird Club
 Ladysmith Birders
 Lakes Bird Club
 Phalaborwa Bird Club
 Rand Barbet Bird Club
 Somerset West Bird Club
 Stanford Bird Club
 Tygerberg Bird Club
 Vaal Bird Club
 West Coast Bird Club
 Witwatersrand Bird Club

See also
Birdwatching
Marutswa Forest Trail & Boardwalk, a project in which BirdLife South Africa is a partner.

References

External links
 Official website

Nature conservation in South Africa
Environmental organisations based in South Africa
Ornithological organizations
Bird conservation organizations
Animal welfare organisations based in South Africa